Events in the year 1970 in Norway.

Incumbents
 Monarch – Olav V
 Prime Minister – Per Borten (Centre Party)

Events 

 27 April – The oil company Phillips Petroleum makes a new oil discovery (Ekofisk oil field) in the North Sea. The Ekofisk oil field remains one of the most important oil fields in the North Sea.
 7 May – Norway's Resistance Museum is opened to the public.
 17 May – Thor Heyerdahl and his crew sets sail from Morocco towards Latin America aboard Ra II, a papyrus boat modeled after ancient Egyptian sailing vessels, in an attempt to cross the Atlantic Ocean and prove his theory that the ancient Egyptians sailed to America in ancient times.
 19 June – The Nature Conservation Act (Naturvernlova) was adopted.
 12 July – Ra II arrives in Barbados.
 20 September – A volcano eruption occurs on Jan Mayen. As a result, the island is evacuated.
 1 November – Population Census: 3,874,133 inhabitants in Norway.
 Kristiansund Airport, Kvernberget is opened for traffic

Popular culture

Sports

Music

Film

Literature
Finn Carling, novelist, playwright, poet and essayist, is awarded the Riksmål Society Literature Prize.
Simen Skjønsberg, journalist and writer, is awarded the Mads Wiel Nygaard's Endowment literary prize.

Notable births
 
 

4 January – Carl Frode Tiller, author
12 January – Line Johansen, sport wrestler.
15 January – Geir Tangen, crime novelist.
25 January – Margunn Haugenes, footballer.
4 February – Nina Nilsen, sport wrestler.
6 February – Trine Lise Sundnes, politician and trade unionist.
23 February – Heidi Marie Kriznik, novelist and organizational leader.
27 February – Jørn Lier Horst, crime fiction writer.
22 March – Gunhild Ørn, cyclist.
30 March – Signe Trosten, biathlete.
31 March – Linn Skåber, actress, singer, comedian, text writer and TV personality.
2 April – Anette Tønsberg, speed skater.
7 April – Maria Strømme, physicist
8 April – Torill Eidsheim, politician.
16 April – Margreth Olin, film director.
28 May – Gry Blekastad Almås, journalist and news anchor
11 June – Hilde Magnusson Lydvo, politician
13 July – Gudrun Høie, sport wrestler.
24 July – Anja Garbarek, singer-songwriter
26 July – Ingvil Aarbakke, artist (d.2005)
20 August – Ove Jørstad footballer (d.2008)
24 August – Mona Dahle, handball player.
27 August – Gisle Elvebakken, speed skater.
15 September – Monica Valvik, racing cyclist.
22 September – Ole Petter Andreassen, musician and producer
13 November – Kjerstin Wøyen Funderud, politician.
22 November – Nils-Ole Foshaug, politician.
8 December – Mads Ousdal, actor.
16 December – Astri Aas-Hansen, politician

Notable deaths

2 February – Hannah Ryggen, textile artist (born 1894).
4 February – Sig Haugdahl, motor racing driver in America (b.1891)
7 February – Ole Landmark, architect (b.1885)
11 February – Per Næsset, politician (b.1898)
12 February – Johan Strand Johansen, politician and Minister (b.1903)
18 March – Håkon Endreson, gymnast and Olympic silver medallist (b.1891)
18 April – Halfdan Bjølgerud, high jumper (b.1884)
5 May – Finn Bjørnseth, geodesist (born 1892).
12 May – Gunvald Tomstad, resistance fighter (b.1918)
22 May – Birger Var, rower and Olympic bronze medallist (b.1893)
24 May – Harald Hagen, sailor and Olympic gold medallist (b.1902)
27 June – Lauritz Schmidt, sailor and Olympic silver medallist (b.1897)
11 July – Niels Larsen Bruun, naval officer (born 1893)
28 July – Ola Teigen, politician (b.1937)
29 July – Johannes S. Andersen, renowned career criminal and resistance fighter (b.1898)
23 September – Magnus Johansen, politician (b.1886)
12 October – Alfred Vågnes, politician (b.1880)
19 October – Conrad Olsen, rower and Olympic bronze medallist (b.1891)
9 November – John Schjelderup Giæver, author and polar researcher (b.1901)
23 November – Alf Prøysen, writer and musician (b.1914)

Full date unknown
Halvard Lange, diplomat, politician and Minister (b.1902)
Ole H. Løvlien, politician (b.1897)
Sverre Munck, businessperson (b.1898)
Jakob Martin Pettersen, politician and Minister (b.1899)
Henry Rudi, huntsman and polar bear hunter (b.1889)

See also

References

External links